Zheng Long (born 15 April 1988) is a Chinese footballer who currently plays as a left winger for Qingdao Hainiu.

Club career
Zheng Long started his football career after he graduated from top tier Qingdao Jonoon's youth academy in 2006. Throughout the 2007 season, he would start to gain significant playing time and go on to score his first goal of his career, which was a free kick in a league game on 7 April 2007 against Changchun Yatai in a 2-1 defeat. He would go on to start to establish himself as a regular for the team, however it was during the 2008 season that saw Zheng established himself as the clubs prominent left-sided player and an expert free kick specialist with five goals in 27 appearances.

On 19 July 2013, Zheng was loaned to fellow Chinese Super League side Guangzhou Evergrande until 31 December 2013. He made his debut for the club in a league game on 31 July 2013 in a 3–0 win against Beijing Guoan. Zheng would go on to win his first league title with Guangzhou and permanently transferred to them before the start of the 2014 season after Qingdao was relegated from the top tier in the 2013 Chinese Super League season. He would not play any matches during the 2014 season due to a serious fractured toe, however the following season on his return he would become a vital member of the team that that win the league title and 2015 AFC Champions League.

On 26 February 2019, Zheng was loaned to fellow top tier side Dalian Professional for the 2019 season. On 31 July 2019, Zheng permanently transferred to the club. After three seasons with Dalian, Zheng returned to Qingdao, with the renamed Qingdao Hainiu on 29 April 2022. He would go on to make his debut in a league game on 30 June 2022 against Shaanxi Chang'an Athletic in a 2-1 victory, where he also scored. He would go on to establish himself as regular within the team that gained promotion to the top tier at the end of the 2022 China League One campaign.

International career
Zheng made his debut for the Chinese national team on 18 July 2009 in a 3–1 win against Palestine. He scored his first goal for the national team on 8 November 2009 in a 2–2 draw against Kuwait.

Career statistics

Club statistics
.

International statistics

International goals
Scores and results list China's goal tally first.

Honours

Club
Guangzhou Evergrande
Chinese Super League: 2013, 2014, 2015, 2016, 2017
AFC Champions League: 2013, 2015
Chinese FA Cup: 2016
Chinese FA Super Cup: 2016, 2017, 2018

References

External links
 
郑龙 Player profile at sohu.com (Chinese)

1988 births
Living people
Chinese footballers
Footballers from Qingdao
China international footballers
Qingdao Hainiu F.C. (1990) players
Guangzhou F.C. players
Dalian Professional F.C. players
Chinese Super League players
Association football wingers